This page lists the awards won by players of the Baltimore Ravens, a professional American football team who compete in the National Football League. The Ravens' most recent award winners were Lamar Jackson John Harbaugh and Greg Roman, who won the MVP, Coach of the Year and Assistant Coach of the Year awards respectively at the 9th Annual NFL Honors.

Individual league awards

Associated Press NFL Most Valuable Player Award 

 2019: Lamar Jackson, QB

Associated Press NFL Offensive Player of the Year Award 

 2003: Jamal Lewis, RB

Associated Press NFL Defensive Player of the Year Award 

 2000: Ray Lewis, LB
 2003: Ray Lewis, LB
 2004: Ed Reed, S
 2011: Terrell Suggs, LB

Associated Press NFL Defensive Rookie of the Year Award 

 1997: Peter Boulware, LB
 2003: Terrell Suggs, LB

Super Bowl Most Valuable Player Award 

 2001 (XXXV): Ray Lewis, LB
 2013 (XLVII): Joe Flacco, QB

Associated Press NFL Coach of the Year Award

 2019: John Harbaugh

Associated Press NFL Assistant Coach of the Year Award 

 2019: Greg Roman

Walter Payton NFL Man of the Year Award 

 2011: Matt Birk, C

NFLPA Alan Page Community Award 

 2001: Michael McCrary, DE

Bart Starr Award 

 2018: Benjamin Watson, TE

References 

Baltimore Ravens
American football team records and statistics